Pakod is a village in Zala County, Hungary. 

The time zone used there is CEST (Central European Standard Time).

External links 
 Street map 

Populated places in Zala County